David Tom Potts, CBE (born 18 March 1957) is a British corporate executive. Since March 2015, he has been the CEO of the British supermarket chain Morrisons, having succeeded Dalton Philips.

Early life
David Tom Potts was born on 18 March 1957 in Ashton-under-Lyne, and educated there at Hartshead County Secondary School.

Potts got a summer job at Tesco in Ashton-under-Lyne as a general assistant, while waiting for his O-level results, having already worked in a greengrocers. He failed all five of his O-levels, and has stated, "My lack of success at school was probably to do with playing football all the time".

Career
Having failed his exams, Potts continued working full-time with Tesco. After work, he studied at Tameside College to obtain English and Maths O-levels. Then he studied on day release for a diploma in retailing at Hollings College (now part of Manchester Metropolitan University) in Manchester.

Aged 24, he was posted to Ryde on the Isle of Wight, as Tesco's youngest-ever superstore manager.

In February 2015, it was announced that Potts would succeed Dalton Philips as CEO of Morrisons, who would step down after five years in charge.

Honours
In the 2013 New Year Honours, Potts was appointed a Commander of the Order of the British Empire (CBE) "for services to Employment, Skills and Apprenticeships in the Retail Sector".

Personal life 
He has two sons, Dan and George. and two grandchildren Esmé and Leo, the children of Dan and his wife Sarah. His partner is Jane Holt.

References

1957 births
British retail chief executives
Living people
Commanders of the Order of the British Empire
People from Ashton-under-Lyne